The Republic of China Military Police (ROCMP) is a military police body under the Ministry of National Defense of Taiwan. Unlike military police in many other countries, the ROCMP is a separate branch of the ROC Armed Forces.  ROCMP is responsible for protecting government leaders from assassination or capture, guarding Taiwan's strategic facilities, and counterintelligence against enemy infiltrators, spies, and saboteurs.

History

Warlords Era
The Republic of China Military Police dated back to 1914. When the provisional president of Republic of China, Dr. Sun Yat-sen, took the office in Guangzhou, an internal security unit was established to enforce military discipline among the troops loyal to the Republic of China Provisional Government. This unit was later renamed Military Police and would gradually expand and become the present-day Republic of China Military Police. In 1925, under the supervision of then general Chiang Kai-shek, the military police was expanded from a single company to a full battalion, and was attached to the Northern Expedition Forces the next year. In the next ten years, the military police gradually expanded into several regiments, and was active in purging the communist elements within the Nationalist government.

Xi'an Incident

On 12 December 1936, while accompanying Chiang Kai-shek on an inspection trip to Xi'an, members of Military Police clashed with Zhang Xueliang's elite bodyguards when the latter were sent to arrest the generalissimo. The military police were caught off guard and outnumbered, and were soon overpowered by Zhang's force, who later arrested Chiang and his entourage in what is later known as the Xi'an Incident. More than one hundred military police became casualties in the brief battle. However, to commemorate the heroic actions of the Military Police, Chiang ordered December 12 to be the Military Police Day. This holiday is no longer observed by the Republic of China government.

World War Two and Civil War

During the Second Sino-Japanese War, the Military Police troopers sometimes found themselves clashing with the Japanese despite the fact that they were neither properly trained nor equipped for such combat tasks. In the January 28 Incident, Shanghai and Battle of Nanjing in 1932 and 1937, the Military Police put up fierce resistance against the Japanese forces, and suffered heavy casualties. The Military Police were also instrumental in operations behind Japanese line, and in time continued to expand under the direction of Nationalist Military. Military Police were also active in keeping the influences of the communists at bay, and were successful at quelling an attempted insurrection by the communists in 1941. The last task of the Military Police in the war was to provide escort to the Japanese delegates to arrange the surrender.

Full scale civil war broke out in 1946 between the Nationalists and the Communists; however, the Military Police were not as active in combat as they once were in the war against Japan. The Military Police were tasked to protect important governmental facilities from sabotages as well as political figures from assassinations. Furthermore, several Military Police regiments were involved in suppressing civil unrests in the newly acquired territories of Taiwan. The Military Police headquarters were moved to Taipei in 1950 following the defeat on the mainland and evacuation to Taiwan.

Taiwan

After retreating to Taiwan in 1949, ROCMP units were put in charge of 2 main missions besides the typical law enforcement over other military personnel---co-locate with major ROC military units in order to closely monitor those units and to sound off alarm of military mutiny if necessary, and to protect the central government by having sentry outposts in all bridges and roads leading into Taipei with orders of blowing bridges and roads if necessary.

In 1970, under the advice from the US Military Mission to the ROC, the ROC Armed Forces reorganized all their regiments into brigades. On 16 March 1970, the Military Police Command formed up four regional commands from the original military police regiments: 201st regional command from the 101st Military Police regiment for presidential guards, 202nd from the 201st MP regiment for capital garrison, 203rd from the 202nd MP regiment in Miaoli, and 204th from the 203rd MP regiment in Tainan City. The ROCMP sentry outposts outside of Taipei was stopped after the 1990s.
 
In January 2006, all ten security battalions under the Republic of China Air Force were transferred to the Military Police Command.

Functions

From the 2006 National Defense Report, Republic of China Military Police performs
Military functions:
special security duties, including presidential protection,
counter-terrorism operations,
garrison security,
enforce military discipline,
support military operations,
Supportive functions in civilian affairs:
execute military justice and law enforcement missions,
maintain public security,
adequately support regional disaster prevention,
response, and ensure social stability and national security.

Military
ROCMP is responsible for enforcing military law, maintaining military discipline, providing manpower support for the civilian police force, performing combat duty in times of emergency, providing security for certain governmental facilities such as including the Presidential Office Building, and performing counter-terrorism and VIP protection operations. It is also responsible for the defense of Taipei, the capital city and political and financial center of the Republic of China.

Intelligence
Due to traditional and historical reasons, Republic of China Military Police still carry out intelligence missions in six categories of security investigations to fulfill its tasked functions:
Special services for presidential security and protection
Politics
Military
Criminal cases
Foreign affairs
Social order

These security investigations are mainly run by every regional investigation group, the mobile investigation group, and their superior unit, the Intelligence Division of the Military Police Command. The main goal of these six security investigations is centered at the first one: special services for presidential security and protection. More practically, it is to satisfy the request from the Commander in Chief, the ROC President.

While performing its intelligence missions, Republic of China Military Police is submitted to the supervisory and coordination from National Security Bureau of National Security Council.

Law enforcement

In accordance with; Clause 2, Section 1 of Article 229; Clause 2, Section 1 of Article 230; and  Clause 2, Section 1 of Article 231 of The Criminal Procedure Code of the ROC, the commissioned and non-commissioned officers, and the enlisted persons of the MP Corps have the authority to assist public prosecutors or to be commanded by prosecutors to investigate crime activities. In the other words, performing the authority of Judicial Police are given by The Criminal Procedure Code of the ROC to the Security MP troops in the regional Military Police units, and it is the same in nature as the police performing the actual criminal investigations. Before the establishment and expansion of the mobile forces of special police corps in the ROC, Military Police troops were the main force to secure and prevent high-profile criminal activities, heavy violence, and frequent society disorders or riots. At present, Military Police troops are still aggressively working with and commanded by the district public procurator systems to investigate criminal cases. The Security MP troops are still one of the important forces that uphold the law and order of society in the Republic of China.

Because of the frequent military personnel rotations and the conscription system in the ROC, people within the regional Military Police units develop relatively fewer ties with local residents, in comparison with the local police departments.  Also, the local police departments must answer to the corresponding local elected officials administratively but the regional Military Police units do not. In the cases of prostitution and human slavery, this makes the ROC Military Police the preferred law enforcement unit for the public prosecutors of all levels in the ROC, because of minimal information leakage or less interference from domestic politicians.

In cases of fugitive recovery, some public prosecutors mobilize the military police to handle large-scale searches or arrests because military police can provide massive manpower with good discipline and fewer gang-related interpersonal relationships.

Organization

Republic of China Military Police Command
Republic of China Military Police Command is responsible for all Military Police units and operations. It is subordinate to the Armed Force General Staff, the Minister of National Defense, and the Republic of China President. It includes internal units that are responsible for political warfare, units inspection, personnel, intelligence, operation, logistics, and communication. It is also responsible for the following units and divisions:
Military Police School
Military Police Regional Commands (x4)
Military Police Armor Battalion
Artillery Battalion
Military Police Battalions (x19)
Military Police Security Squadron of Air Force (x10): Specially tasked to guard military air bases or field.
Naval Military Police Security Battalions (x2):Specially tasked to guard naval bases.
Regional Military Police Offices (x22): It is a battalion-size unit stationed in the urban area.
Regional Military Police Investigation Groups: Administratively, it belongs to its corresponding regional office; operationally, it is controlled by the intelligence division (G2) of the Military Police Command.
Forensic Science Center
Chemical Forensic Division
Physical Forensic Division
Crime Scene Investigation Division
Military Police Special Services Company, MPSSC: Code-named Night Hawk. This unit is stationed at Wugu, Taipei. Little is known about this unit, since information about it is classified by the Ministry of National Defense. It was formed in 1978.
Xindian Military Prison, New Taipei City
Lioujia Military Prison, Tainan City

Ranks
 Officers

 Enlisted

Banners

Equipment

Vehicles

Small arms

Fire support

Gallery

See also
People's Armed Police
Military Police Corps (United States)

References

External links

 ROC Military Police Command

M
M
Taiwanese intelligence agencies
Taiwan